Fornells may refer to:

Fornells, Menorca
Fornells de Mar, beach and bay in the Costa Brava (zipcode 17255) 
Fornells de la Selva, suburb of Girona, 17458 
Fornells de Muntanya, hamlet near Planoles west of the Serra Cavallera, 17536